Alfred Giles may refer to:

 Alfred Giles (architect) (1853–1920), Texas architect
 Alfred Giles (civil engineer) (1816–1895), British civil engineer and politician
 Alfred Giles (explorer) (1846–1931), South Australian bushman, drover and explorer

See also 
 Alfred William Gyles (1888–1967), New Zealand chess champion (1931, 1936)